Harry Robert Hinkel (January 13, 1904 – April 12, 2001) was an American racewalker. He competed at the 1924 Summer Olympics and the 1932 Summer Olympics.

References

External links
 

1904 births
2001 deaths
Athletes (track and field) at the 1924 Summer Olympics
Athletes (track and field) at the 1932 Summer Olympics
American male racewalkers
Olympic track and field athletes of the United States
Track and field athletes from New York City